Scatter are an improvisational collective, based in Glasgow.

The membership of the group is fluid. Members have included Nick McCarthy, Oliver Neilson and Hanna Tuulikki. The Blank Tapes label released their album The Mountain Announces.

Discography
Surprising Sing Stupendous Love (2004/Cenotaph)
The Mountain Announces (2006/Blank Tapes)

References

Scottish folk music groups
British jazz ensembles
Musical collectives